An Arbir is an Indonesian weapon, a halberd, approximately five feet (1.5 m) long.

The staff has a shallow groove running along its length marking the plane of the blade, allowing the user to determine exactly where the cutting edge is at all times. The Arbir is one of three special weapons used by members of the Persatuan Pencak Silat Selurah Indonesia (PPSI).

See also

 Bambu runcing

References

Weapons of Indonesia
Polearms